General Dean may refer to:

Aaron R. Dean II (fl. 1980s–2010s), U.S. Army brigadier general 
Clyde D. Dean (1930–2001), U.S. Marine Corps lieutenant general
James Theodore Dean (1865–1939), U.S. Army brigadier general 
Richard D. Dean (born 1929), U.S. Army brigadier general
William F. Dean (1899–1981), U.S. Army major general

See also
John R. Deane (1896–1982), U.S. Army major general
John R. Deane Jr. (1919–2013), U.S. Army general
Tony Deane-Drummond (1917–2012), British Army major general